Eberhard Wächter may refer to:

Eberhard Georg Friedrich von Wächter (1762–1852), German painter
Eberhard Wächter (baritone), sometimes spelled Waechter, (1929–1992), Austrian opera singer